Nogueira, Galician and Portuguese for walnut tree, may refer to:

People with the surname
 Antônio Rodrigo "Minotauro" Nogueira (born 1976), Brazilian MMA fighter
 Antônio Rogério Nogueira, the "Minotouro" (born 1976), Brazilian MMA fighter, twin brother of Antônio Rodrigo Nogueira
 Bernardo de Sá Nogueira de Figueiredo (1795–1876), Portuguese politician
 Camilo Nogueira Román (born 1936), Spanish politician
 Fernando Nogueira (born 1950), Portuguese politician
 Fabricio Nogueira Nascimento (born 1976), Brazilian footballer
 Fernando António Nogueira Pessoa (1888–1935), Portuguese poet
 Lucas Nogueira (born 1992), Brazilian basketball player
 Mikayla Nogueira, American social media influencer and make-up artist
 Patrick Nogueira (born 1996), Brazilian murderer
 Paulinho Nogueira (1929–2003), Brazilian musician
 Paulo Nogueira Neto (born 1922), Brazilian environmentalist
 Victor Nogueira (born 1959), Mozambique-born American soccer goalkeeper
 Wellington Damião Nogueira Marinho (born 1981), Brazilian footballer
 Tadeu Jesus Nogueira Júnior (born 1981), Juninho, Brazilian footballer
 Nogueira Ferrão, Portuguese family name
 Vincent Nogueira (born 1988), French footballer

Places

Brazil
Nogueira, Bahia, a municipality of the State of Bahia
Artur Nogueira, a municipality of the State of São Paulo
Nogueira, Amazonas, a village on the shore of Lake Tefe, State of Amazonas

Portugal
Nogueira (Braga), a civil parish in the municipality of Braga
Nogueira (Bragança), a civil parish in the municipality of Bragança
Nogueira (Lousada), a civil parish in the municipality of Lousada
Nogueira (Maia), a civil parish in the municipality of Maia
Nogueira (Ponte da Barca), a civil parish in the municipality of Ponte da Barca
Nogueira (Viana do Castelo), a civil parish in the municipality of Viana do Castelo
Nogueira (Vila Nova de Cerveira), a civil parish in the municipality of Vila Nova de Cerveira
Nogueira (Vila Real), a civil parish in the municipality of Vila Real

Portuguese-language surnames